Brush Creek is a stream in Polk and St. Clair counties of southwest Missouri. It is a tributary of the Sac River.

Brush Creek was so named on account of brush near its course.

See also
List of rivers of Missouri

References

Rivers of Polk County, Missouri
Rivers of St. Clair County, Missouri
Rivers of Missouri